Nightingale Valley Halt was a railway station near Bristol, England, on the Portishead Railway. It was situated approximately 190 metres north-west of the Clifton Suspension Bridge, and was for the benefit of visitors to Leigh Woods. It opened on 9 July 1928, and closed on 12 September 1932. No significant traces of the station survive today.

References 

Disused railway stations in Somerset
Former Great Western Railway stations
Railway stations in Great Britain opened in 1928
Railway stations in Great Britain closed in 1932